Orynbaev Amanbai Tlewbaevich — (born September 17, 1979, Kegeyli district, Karakalpak ASSR, Uzbek SSR, USSR,) Karakalpak and Uzbek statesman and politician, chairman of the Jokargy Kenes of the Republic of Karakalpakstan since August 26, 2022, and concurrently deputy head of the Senate of the Republic of Uzbekistan.

Biography 
Amanbai Orinbaev was born on September 17, 1979 in the Kegeyli region. By nationality Karakalpak.

Lobar activities 
Minister of Internal Affairs of the Republic of Karakalpakstan 2022-2022, Minister of Internal Affairs of the Republic of Uzbekistan - First Deputy Chairman of the Council of Ministers of the Republic of Karakalpakstan on ecology and development of the Aral Sea region

Since 26 August 2022 - Chairman of Jokargy Kenes of the Republic of Karakalpakstan

Other Link 
 Official site Jokargi kenes
 Official instagram account Amanbai Orinbayev

References 

1979 births
People from Nukus
Members of the Senate of Uzbekistan
Living people